The Ten Thousand Islands are a chain of islands and mangrove islets off the coast of southwest Florida, between Cape Romano (at the south end of Marco Island) and the mouth of the Lostmans River. Some of the islands are high spots on a submergent coastline. Others were produced by mangroves growing on oyster bars. Despite the name, the islets in the chain only number in the hundreds.

Geography
The northern part of the Ten Thousand Islands, between Cape Romano and Everglades City, is in the Ten Thousand Islands National Wildlife Refuge. The southern part of the Ten Thousands Islands, south of Everglades City, is in Everglades National Park. 
The 99-mile-long (159 km) Wilderness Waterway begins at Everglades City and ends at Flamingo at the southern tip of the Florida peninsula.  Administrative control of the islands is split between Collier County and Monroe County.

Archaeology
The Ten Thousand Islands were used and occupied by Native Americans for thousands of years. Evidence of former living sites can be found under as much as four feet (1.2 m) of water. A number of shell rings and other shell complexes have been identified in or adjacent to the Ten Thousand Islands. The Horr's Island archaeological site at the northern end of the Ten Thousand Islands was occupied year-round 3,500 years ago, and other sites are presumed to have been inundated by a rise in sea level. The material culture of the Indians living in the Ten Thousand Islands was distinctive enough to be classified as, at least, a sub-area of the Glades culture area.

Demography
Almost all of the Ten Thousand Islands are currently uninhabited. The largest, Chokoloskee Island, which is connected to Everglades City by a causeway, has about 400 permanent residents. Other islands have been sporadically inhabited in the 19th and 20th centuries by individuals or families.

Recreation

Some of the Ten Thousand Islands are suitable for overnight visits, as dictated by the United States Fish and Wildlife Service. Since this is a wilderness area where wind, weather and lack of fresh water can become threatening, the Wildlife Service recommends only seasoned canoeists and sea kayakers attempt the trip.

Part of the archipelago lies within Everglades National Park. The following islands are officially designated camping sites:

 Hog Key
 Turkey Key
 New Turkey Key
 Mormon Key
 Pavilion Key
 Rabbit Key
 Jewel Key
 Picnic Key
 Tiger Key

Dark skies recreation
Ten Thousand Islands archipelago is among the best and last remaining dark skies sites in coastal Southwest Florida. Most notable is Pavilion Key that lies 11 miles south of Everglades City and lacks any urban development to the south of it. The pristine nature and low south latitude makes the area among the best and unique spots for stargazing and Milky Way astrophotography.

See also
 Rookery Bay National Estuarine Research Reserve
 Dismal Key

References

External links

Usgs.gov: Ten Thousand Islands and Rookery Bay
Ten Thousand Islands National Wildlife Refuge Profile

Islands of Florida
Everglades National Park
Nature reserves in Florida
Islands of Collier County, Florida
Uninhabited islands of Monroe County, Florida